Bittering is a hamlet in the county of Norfolk, England, now in the civil parish of Beeston with Bittering. It lies west of East Dereham and south of Fakenham.

The area was formerly Little Bittering parish, which was annexed to the neighbouring Beeston.

The mediaeval church of St Peter is a Grade II* listed building.

References

Notes
 Francis White, History, Gazetteer, and Directory, of Norfolk (1845, reprinted 1969) pp. 327–329

External links

Villages in Norfolk
Breckland District